Falkow may refer to:

Places
Falków, a village in the administrative district of Gmina Rachanie, within Tomaszów Lubelski County, Lublin Voivodeship, Poland
Fałków, a village in Końskie County, Świętokrzyskie Voivodeship, Poland
Gmina Fałków, Końskie County, Świętokrzyskie Voivodeship, in south-central Poland

People with the surname
Stanley Falkow (1934–2018), American microbiologist and professor of microbiology and immunology